U.S. Route 51 Business (US 51 Bus.) is a business route of US 51 in Bloomington–Normal. It provides service to downtown Bloomington and downtown Normal.

Route description 
Starting at the I-74/US 51 interchange, US 51 Business traveled northward via Main Street towards downtown Bloomington. It then meets Interstate 55 Business Loop at a diamond interchange. Shortly after crossing under the interchange, the route then splits into a one-way pair. The northbound route then continues to follow Main Street. However, the southbound route follows Center Street. Continuing north, the route splits even further out near the McLean County Courthouse and Square. Eventually, south of Locust Street, the one-way pair comes closer together but not completely. At Locust Street, the route meets eastbound US 150/IL 9. Southwest of the Illinois Wesleyan University, it meets westbound US 150/IL 9. At Division Street, it leaves Bloomington and enters Normal.

South of the Amtrak railroad overpass, the business route starts to come together. After crossing under the overpass, the southbound route then moves slightly outward (following Kingsley Street). In the Illinois State University, the southbound and the northbound route come together at Main Street/College Avenue. Going further north, it then meets I-55 at a 5-ramp parclo. Going further north, it curves west towards I-39/US 51. At that point, the business route ends.

History 
Initially, US 51 ran straight through downtown Bloomington and Normal. This routing remained like that for a while until around 1991. In the meantime, in 1965, a full cloverleaf interchange was built to serve present-day I-55. In 1966, a parclo interchange was built to serve present-day I-74. By 1979, a parclo interchange that served I-55 Business Loop then became a diamond interchange. Then, in 1990, US 51 bypassed downtown Bloomington and Normal via I-39, I-55, and I-74. As a result, US 51 Business was formed. This also resulted in the cloverleaf interchange (which served I-55) becoming a 5-ramp parclo. To this day, the business route is still intact.

Major intersections

References

External links 
 Illinois Highways Page - Routes 41 through 60

Business (Bloomington–Normal, Illinois)
51 Business (Bloomington–Normal, Illinois)
51 Business (Bloomington–Normal)
Transportation in McLean County, Illinois
Bloomington–Normal